Daniil Medvedev defeated Alexander Zverev in the final, 5–7, 6–4, 6–1 to win the singles tennis title at the 2020 Paris Masters.

Novak Djokovic was the defending champion, but did not participate this year.

Rafael Nadal's victory over Feliciano López in the second round made him only the fourth man in the Open Era to have won 1,000 matches on the ATP Tour. His loss to Zverev in the semifinals meant that Djokovic secured the year-end ATP No. 1 singles ranking for the sixth time, equaling the all-time record held by Pete Sampras. Additionally, following the tournament Nadal surpassed Jimmy Connors's record for the most consecutive days ranked in the world's top 10.

Seeds
The top eight seeds receive a bye into the second round.

Draw

Finals

Top half

Section 1

Section 2

Bottom half

Section 3

Section 4

Qualifying

Seeds

Qualifiers

Lucky losers

Qualifying draw

First qualifier

Second qualifier

Third qualifier

Fourth qualifier

Fifth qualifier

Sixth qualifier

Seventh qualifier

References

External links
Main draw
Qualifying draw

Singles